Oxford High School may refer to one of several secondary schools:

England
Oxford High School, England, Oxfordshire

United States
Oxford High School (Alabama) — Oxford, Alabama
Oxford High School (Connecticut) — Oxford, Connecticut
Oxford High School (Massachusetts) — Oxford, Massachusetts
Oxford High School (Michigan) — Oxford, Michigan
Oxford High School (Mississippi) — Oxford, Mississippi
New Oxford High School — New Oxford, Pennsylvania

See also
 Oxford School (disambiguation)
 Oxford Academy (disambiguation)
 Oxford College (disambiguation)
 Oxford University (disambiguation)